Kronogård is the name of a launch site for sounding rockets in North Sweden at . Kronogård was originally a hunting post for royal foresters and hunters. In the 1950s a rocket launch site was established, from which mainly rockets of the type Nike Cajun were launched to explore the upper atmosphere. After completion of Esrange Kronogard was shut down.

Nowadays there is an area with small houses (partly on the basements of the former launch pads) and a camping site.

Launch list

External links
Article title

Military installations of Sweden